Sergey Deulin (February 12, 1987 – August 2, 2015), better known as Manu Shrine, was a future garage, post-dubstep and ambient producer from Yekaterinburg, Russia. He self-released a full-length album and several EPs. His moody emotional compositions gained online popularity through SoundCloud and SomaFM's Fluid radio.

Manu Shrine composed the music for the mobile app Let's Twist.

Discography

Studio albums
Annutara Ash (2013)

Extended plays
Last Works (2014)
Blame Us (2014)
Inmate (2013)

References

1987 births
2015 deaths
Russian electronic musicians
Dubstep musicians
Future garage musicians